Canada After Dark was Canada's first late-night comedy/variety talk show.  It was hosted by Paul Soles and aired on CBC Television from September 18, 1978 to January 26, 1979.

The show was repackaged from the failed, more informational 90 Minutes Live.  Executive producer Alex Frame and producer Bob Ennis decided to try a show that would be comparable to The Tonight Show instead, changing the name of the show to Canada After Dark and replacing host Peter Gzowski with veteran comedic actor Soles.  The new show would last for less than half a season.

The Royal Canadian Air Farce parodied the show with skits called "Clark In The Dark", featuring then-Prime Minister Joe Clark (played by Don Ferguson)  acting as "host" from the gallery of an empty House Of Commons.  The skits were revived after Clark returned to politics in the late 1990s.

External links

 Queen's University Directory of CBC Television Series (Canada After Dark archived listing link via archive.org)

1978 Canadian television series debuts
1979 Canadian television series endings
1970s Canadian television talk shows
CBC Television original programming
Canadian late-night television programming